Bosselaerius is a genus of Asian spiders in the family Phrurolithidae. It was first described by Alireza Zamani and Yuri M. Marusik in 2020.  it contains only three species: B. daoxianensis, B. hyrcanicus, and B. tajikistanicus.

See also
 Phrurolithus
 List of Phrurolithidae species

References

Further reading

Phrurolithidae genera
Spiders of Asia